Bea is a feminine given name, often short for Beatrice. Notable people with the name include:

 Bea Alonzo (born 1987), Filipina actress and singer
 Bea Arthur (1922–2009), American actress
 Bea Ballard (born 1959), British television producer
 Bea Barrett (1916–2002), American amateur golfer
 Bea Benaderet (1906–1968), American actress
 Bea Bielik (born 1980), American tennis player
 Bea Binene (born 1997), Filipina actress and singer
 Bea Booze (1912–1986), American R&B and jazz singer
 Bea Chester, American baseball player
 Bea Feitler (1938–1982), Brazilian-born art-director
 Bea Firth (1946–2008), Canadian politician
 Bea Gaddy (1933–2001), American humanitarian
 Béa Gonzalez (born 1962), Spanish-Canadian novelist
 Bea Gorton (1946–2020), American college basketball coach
 Gertrude Himmelfarb (1922–2019), also known as Bea Kristol, American historian
 Beatrice Lillie (1894–1989), Canadian actress
 Beatrice Gomez (born 1995), Filipina beauty queen and model
 Bea Maddock (1934–2016), Australian artist
 Bea Miles (1902–1973), Australian eccentric
 Bea Miller (born 1999), American singer
 Bea Nettles (born 1946), art photographer and author
 Bea Nicolas (born 1994), Filipina actress
 Bea Palya (born 1976), Hungarian folk singer
 Bea Santiago (born 1990), Filipina actress and beauty queen of Miss Earth 2017
 Marie Beatrice Schol-Schwarz (1898–1969), also known as Bea Schwartz, Dutch phytopathologist
 Bea Segura (born 1975), Spanish actress
 Bea Wain (1917–2017), American singer
 Bea Wyler (born 1951), Swiss-German rabbi

Fictional Characters 
 Bea (Dennis the Menace), in the British comic strip Dennis the Menace
 Bea, one of the Gym Leaders in Pokémon Sword and Shield
 Bea Goldfishberg, from the American animated television series Fish Hooks
 Beatrice "Bea" Santello, from the video game Night in the Woods

See also 
 Beatrice (disambiguation)
 Béatrice
 Beatrix
 Beatriz

Feminine given names
Filipino feminine given names                                                                
Hypocorisms